Ron Gray may refer to:

 Ron Gray (footballer) (1920–2002), English footballer and manager
 Ron Gray (politician), Canadian politician

See also
Ronald Gray (disambiguation)
 Ron Grey (1930–2022), Australian Army officer